Siddharth Roy Kapur (born 2 August 1974) is an Indian film producer and the founder and managing director of Roy Kapur Films. He is the former managing director of The Walt Disney Company India and the former president of the Producers Guild of India in a tenure lasting an unprecedented six consecutive terms (2016–22).

Roy Kapur's prolific filmography as a producer has received both commercial success and critical acclaim. He has featured for six consecutive years (2017–2022) on Variety’s annual list of the Top 500 Most Influential People in Global Entertainment, has been part of The Economic Times Top 40 Indian Business Leaders Under 40 and The Hollywood Reporter Next Generation Asia Inaugural Class of Young Leaders along with numerous other awards in the media and entertainment industry. He is also a managing trustee of the Mumbai Academy of the Moving Image (MAMI) and co-chairman of the CII Media & Entertainment Committee.

Early life and education

Siddharth Roy Kapur was born in Bombay (present-day Mumbai) on 2 August 1974 to Kumud Roy Kapur and Salome Roy Kapur (née Aaron) who is a former Miss India and renowned dance choreographer. She is the daughter of Sam and Ruby Aaron, who were pioneering teachers of ballroom and Latin American dance forms in India. Roy Kapur is the eldest of three brothers; his younger brothers are the well known actors Kunaal Roy Kapur and Aditya Roy Kapur.

Roy Kapur did his schooling at G.D. Somani Memorial School where he was Head Boy, and went on to study commerce at Sydenham College, where he was Chairperson of the Dramatics Society. After completing his bachelor's degree in commerce, he obtained a master's degree in Management Studies from Jamnalal Bajaj Institute of Management Studies (JBIMS), where he was elected Chairperson of the Final Placement Committee.

Career
Roy Kapur began his career with Procter & Gamble in Mumbai in brand management.

Star TV 
After P&G, he moved to Star TV in the strategic planning division. Following a brief stint in Hong Kong as part of the News Corp Executive Development Program, he moved back to Mumbai to work on the launch marketing of the first season of the landmark TV show Kaun Banega Crorepati on StarPlus. In recognition for the groundbreaking marketing efforts behind the success of the show, he was nominated for the Team News Corp Global Excellence Awards. He then moved to Star TV's Middle East operations, based in Dubai, where he was Regional Marketing Manager for the network. In 2002, Roy Kapur joined the Star headquarters in Hong Kong, as Director (Marketing) and later was promoted to vice president, leading the Central Marketing & Creative Services team across all Asian markets for the Star TV network.

UTV Motion Pictures 
Roy Kapur joined UTV Motion Pictures in Mumbai in 2005, as Senior Vice President, Marketing & Communications. He led the marketing efforts responsible for taking Hungama TV to a leadership position in the competitive kids broadcasting space. He then went on to lead the marketing efforts behind multiple pathbreaking films, including the cult BAFTA-nominated blockbuster Rang De Basanti and the sleeper hit Khosla Ka Ghosla, both of which released in 2006 and started a new trend in the way movies were marketed in India.

In January 2008, Roy Kapur took over as CEO of UTV Motion Pictures and after the integration of UTV with The Walt Disney Company India in 2012, he became the managing director of Studios. He led the studio to commercial success and critical acclaim, producing and releasing some of the most important and successful films of the decade, such as Taare Zameen Par, Jaane Tu... Ya Jaane Na, Jodhaa Akbar, Fashion, Aamir, A Wednesday!, Dev.D, Oye Lucky! Lucky Oye!, Kaminey, Wake Up Sid, Raajneeti, Udaan, Peepli Live, Welcome to Sajjanpur, No One Killed Jessica, Delhi Belly, Paan Singh Tomar, Shahid, Rowdy Rathore, Barfi!, ABCD: Any Body Can Dance, Kai Po Che!, Yeh Jawaani Hai Deewani, The Lunchbox and Chennai Express. The films produced under Roy Kapur's leadership won numerous awards including National Awards and Filmfare Awards, establishing UTV Motion Pictures as one of India's most admired and successful studios. Five of the movies that were selected to represent India at the Academy Awards during Roy Kapur's leadership were either produced or released by UTV Motion Pictures.

The Walt Disney Company 
In January 2014, Roy Kapur was promoted to managing director of Disney India, with the responsibility for driving the strategy and growth for the company across broadcasting, movies, consumer products, digital experiences and live entertainment, represented through multiple brands like Disney, UTV, Marvel, Star Wars, Pixar, ABC, bindass, Indiagames and Hungama TV.

Under Roy Kapur's leadership over three years from 2014 to 2016, Disney emerged as one of India's leading media and entertainment companies, producing and releasing India's highest-grossing movie of all time (Dangal in 2016) and India's then highest-grossing English movie of all time (The Jungle Book in 2016), as well as a host of other successful movies like PK, Kick, 2 States, ABCD 2, Haider, Heropanti, Highway, Khoobsurat and Filmistaan.

Roy Kapur also pioneered a new format of entertainment in the country, producing the first-ever Broadway-scale theatrical show to be mounted in India with a completely local cast and crew, Beauty and the Beast, which opened to huge commercial and critical success in Mumbai and Delhi in 2015.

Roy Kapur Films 
In 2017, Roy Kapur moved on from Disney to set up his own production house, Roy Kapur Films (RKF). RKF's first feature film production, The Sky Is Pink, starring Priyanka Chopra Jonas, had its Gala Premiere at the 2019 Toronto International Film Festival. In 2020, the Netflix original film Yeh Ballet, produced by RKF, released to great acclaim.

RKF's first streaming series, the crime thriller Aranyak, streamed in 2021 and broke into the Global Top 10 list of non-English Series on Netflix in its first week of launch. 2022's Rocket Boys, a SonyLIV original series about the establishment of India's space and atomic programmes, also attained huge success. The second season of Rocket Boys was released in 2023.

RKF's most recent production, the Gujarati film Last Film Show (Chhello Show), was picked as India's official selection for Best International Feature Film at the 2023 Academy Awards, and made it to the official shortlist for the category, only the fourth Indian film to reach this stage.

Upcoming projects from Roy Kapur Films include the war drama Pippa, comedies Woh Ladki Hai Kahan? and Bas Karo Aunty!, as well as the official series adaptation of William Dalrymple's 2019 bestseller The Anarchy: The Relentless Rise of the East India Company.

Personal life
Roy Kapur married actress Vidya Balan on 14 December 2012.

Filmography

Producer

Awards
 2009 – Best film for Jodhaa Akbar at Filmfare Awards, Screen Awards, IIFA Awards
 2012 – National Film Award for Best Children's Film for Chillar Party
 2013 – National Film Award for Best Feature Film for Paan Singh Tomar
 2013 – Best film for Barfi! at BIG Star Entertainment Awards, Zee Cine Awards, Filmfare Awards, Stardust Awards, IIFA Awards
 2013 – Screen Award for Best Film for Paan Singh Tomar
 2013 – Society Young Achievers Awards 2013 in the Business category
 2014 – The Economic Times – Spencer Stuart '40 under Forty' India's Hottest Business Leaders Award
 2017 – Best Film for Dangal at Filmfare Awards
 2022 – Best Series for Rocket Boys at Filmfare OTT Awards

References

External links 

 Bio at Livemint.com
 

Indian chief executives
Film producers from Mumbai
1974 births
Living people
University of Mumbai alumni
Jamnalal Bajaj Institute of Management Studies alumni
Indian television executives
Hindi film producers
Indian Jews
Tamil film producers
Malayalam film producers